= Turkmeneli Cooperation and Culture Foundation =

- Purpose: Educational, Cultural, Social initiatives
- Region served: Iraq, Turkey
- Website: https://www.turkmenelivakfi.org/

The Turkmeneli Cooperation and Culture Foundation is a non-governmental organization that supports the Turkmen community in Iraq and Turkey, focusing on educational, cultural, and social initiatives.

== Affiliations and Partnerships ==
The Turkmeneli Cooperation and Culture Foundation collaborates with various organizations to further its educational, cultural, and social initiatives. One such partnership is with the Avrasya İncelemeleri Merkezi/Center for Eurasian Studies (AVİM), established in Ankara, Turkey, in 2009. AVİM conducts research on topics relevant to Turkey in the Caucasus, the Balkans, Eastern Europe, and Asia, focusing particularly on Russia, the Turkic Republics, and Iraq, among other countries. The center's activities include publishing research in various formats, organizing conferences, and providing educational services. AVİM's engagement extends to issues within the European Union Organization and its member countries.

== History and Background ==
The Foundation was established to support the Turkmen community, particularly in Iraq. The Turkmen community has faced a range of challenges in Iraq, including political, security, and human rights issues.

== Activities and Programs ==
=== Education ===
The Foundation supports education initiatives, such as Turkish-language education in Iraq. The enrollment in these schools, including from non-Turkmen families, has increased.

=== Cultural and Social Activities ===
The Foundation is involved in cultural and social activities that aim to support and preserve Turkmen heritage and identity.

=== International Collaboration ===
The Foundation engages in international collaborations, focusing on cultural exchange and the promotion of Turkic history and values.

== Impact and Outreach ==
The Foundation's activities have an impact on various aspects of Turkmen life in Iraq. It advocates for rights and aims to enhance political representation.
